The Boy Who Cried Wolf is one of Aesop's fables

Music
"Boy Who Cried Wolf" (song) a 1985 Style Council song 
"The Boy Who Cried Wolf", by Futures from the 2010 album The Holiday
The Boy Who Cried Wolf (Passenger album), released in 2017
The Boy Who Cried Wolf (San E album), released in 2015

Film and TV
'The Boy Who Cried Wolf', segment of 2007 Chinese short film Crossed Lines (film)
'The Boy Who Cried Wolf', TV episode  Season 5 Episode 1 Rin Tin Tin: K-9 Cop (1988)
'The Boy Who Cried Wolf', TV episode Season 1  Episode 7  Super Why! (2007 TV Series)
'The Boy Who Cried Wolf', TV episode  Season 1 Episode 4 Chopper One (1974 TV Series)
'The Boy Who Cried Wolf', TV episode  Season 3 Episode 3 Lassie (1997 TV series)
'The Boy Who Cried Wolf', TV episode  Season 1 Episode 10 Pinocchio (TV series) 2014   
'The Boy Who Cried Wolf', TV episode  Season 1 Episode 8 Between the Lions (1999-2000 TV Series)
'The Boy Who Cried Wolf', TV episode  Season 1 Episode 4 Shadow of Truth (2016 Israeli TV Mini-Series)
The Boys Who Cried Wolf 양치기들; RR: Yang-chi-gi-deul) 2015 Korean film

See also
Boy Cried Wolf
Cry Wolf (disambiguation)
The Boy Who Cried Bitch (1991)
The Boy Who Cried Woof (2007) (TV Episode) Season 3 Episode 16 What's with Andy? (2000) (TV Series)
The Boy Who Tried Wolf (2002) (TV Episode) Season 3  Episode 14 Big Wolf on Campus (1999) (TV Series)
The Man Who Cried Wolf (disambiguation)
The Girl Who Cried Wolf (disambiguation)
The Boy Who Cried Werewolf (disambiguation)